The Benin Premier League, also called Championnat National du Bénin in French, is the highest football division in Benin. The league was held in 1969 for the first time. Currently, the initial round is a double round-robin tournament, with 36 clubs being divided in 4 groups, and 9 clubs in each. The last 5 teams of each group, goes to the relegation round, which consists on 2 groups of 10 teams. The first 4 teams of each group goes to the final stage with 16 clubs playing a single round-robin tournament. The winner of this round (and of the Premier League) earns a place in the CAF Champions League.

2021-22 season teams

Group A  
Béké FC de Bembèrèkè (Bembèrèkè)
Buffles du Borgou FC (Parakou)
Cavaliers FC (Nikki)
Damissa FC (Nikki)
Dynamique Djougou (Djougou)
Dynamo Parakou (Parakou)
Real Sport de Parakou FC (Parakou)
Panthères FC (Djougou)
Takunnin FC (Kandi)

Group B 
Dadje FC d'Aplahoué (Aplahoué)
Dynamo Abomey FC (Abomey)
Energie FC (Sèmè-Kpodji)
FC Loto (Sakété)
Espoir FC (Savalou)
Hodio FC (Comè)
Soleil FC (Cotonou)
Tonnerre d'Abomey FC (Bohicon)
US Baboni (Parakou)

Group C  
Ajijas Cotonou (Cotonou)
AS Cotonou (Cotonou)
ASPAC FC (Cotonou)
AS Police FC (Porto-Novo)
Coton FC de Ouidah (Ouidah)
Eternel (Cotonou)
Requins de l'Atlantique FC (Cotonou)
Sitatunga FC (Abomey-Calavi)
UPI-ONM FC (Cotonou)

Group D 
AS Dragons FC de l'Ouémé (Porto-Novo)
AS Sobemap Sport (Porto-Novo)
ASVO FC (Porto-Novo)
ASOS (Porto-Novo)
Avrankou Omnisport FC (Avrankou)
Ayema (Sèmè-Kpodji)
Djèffa FC (Sèmè-Kpodji)
JA Cotonou (Cotonou)
JS Pobè (Pobè)

ASPAC and Takunnin played in the final of the league. Takunnin won the final.

Final clubs' stadiums

Previous champions 

1969 : FAD Cotonou
1970 : AS Porto-Novo
1971 : AS Cotonou
1972 : AS Porto-Novo
1973 : AS Porto-Novo
1974 : Etoile Sportive Porto-Novo
no championship between 1975 and 1977
1978 : AS Dragons FC de l'Ouémé (Porto-Novo)
1979 : AS Dragons FC de l'Ouémé (Porto-Novo)
1980 : Buffles du Borgou FC (Parakou)
1981 : Ajijas Cotonou
1982 : AS Dragons FC de l'Ouémé (Porto-Novo)
1983 : AS Dragons FC de l'Ouémé (Porto-Novo)
1984 : Lions de l'Atakory (Cotonou)
1985 : Requins de l'Atlantique FC (Cotonou)
1986 : AS Dragons FC de l'Ouémé (Porto-Novo)
1987 : Requins de l'Atlantique FC (Cotonou)
1988 : no championship
1989 : AS Dragons FC de l'Ouémé (Porto-Novo)
1990 : Requins de l'Atlantique FC (Cotonou)
1991 : Postel Sport FC (Porto-Novo)
1992 : Buffles du Borgou FC (Parakou)
1993 : AS Dragons FC de l'Ouémé (Porto-Novo)
1994 : AS Dragons FC de l'Ouémé (Porto-Novo)
1995 : Toffa Cotonou
1996 : Mogas 90 FC (Porto Novo)
1997 : Mogas 90 FC (Porto Novo)
1998 : AS Dragons FC de l'Ouémé (Porto-Novo)
1999 : AS Dragons FC de l'Ouémé (Porto-Novo)
no official championship between 2000 and 2001
2001/02 : AS Dragons FC de l'Ouémé (Porto-Novo)
2003 : AS Dragons FC de l'Ouémé (Porto-Novo)
2004 : not finished
2005 : no championship
2005/06 : Mogas 90 FC (Porto Novo)
2007 : Tonnerre d'Abomey FC
2008/09 : declared invalid
2009 : no competition
2009/10 : ASPAC FC
2010/11 : suspended
2011/12 : ASPAC FC
2012/13 : Jeunesse Athlétique du Plateau
2013/14 : Buffles du Borgou FC (Parakou)
2014/15 : abandoned
2016 : abandoned
2017 : Buffles du Borgou FC (Parakou)
2018/19 : Buffles du Borgou FC (Parakou)
2019/20 : abandoned 
2020/21 : FC Loto (Sakété) 
2021/22 : Coton Sport FC (Ouidah)

Performance by club

References

External links 
 RSSSF competition history for Benin League Championships
 Fédération Béninoise de Football Dead Link

 
Football leagues in Benin
Benin
Sports leagues established in 1969
1969 establishments in Africa